Lalor Roddy (born 30 November 1954) is a Northern Irish actor, described by the Irish Times theater critic Fintan O'Toole as "surely the finest Irish actor of his generation".

Youth
Roddy was born and grew up in Belfast, Northern Ireland. In 2014, he stated in an interview about his youth: "Theatre was very much part of our upbringing and the cinema as well. My mother was associated with the Lyric Theatre in its early days in both a managerial and performing capacity back when they were in Derryvolgie Avenue. We were dragged along to the theatre and I never lost a love for it. It was a magical experience where you were transformed to another world. My mother’s father managed cinemas in Belfast, in the Falls Road and the top of the Shankill, and he would have brought me along on a lot of Saturdays to the matinees and that filled me with a similar love, so that love was always there despite me taking another route in life."

As an young man, he left for the United States to play football (soccer). Upon his return to Northern Ireland, he  majored in psychology at the University of Ulster. Roddy had been working as a psychologist in England until he returned home to Ulster at the age of 33 to take up acting, saying: "I had been working as a psychologist in England, but decided the time had come to get out. I had had enough therapy to last me a lifetime. Maybe it was the lurking actor in me, but I found I was taking too many people’s problems onto myself – and paying the price. At least now, I can inflict them on others!"

In the theater
In 1988 together with Tim Loane and Stephen Wright he founded the Tinderbox theater company in Belfast, which produced two plays by Harold Pinter. The two plays were produced on the very modest budget of £75 pounds each. In 1989, the Tinderbox company received a cheque from the playwright Samuel Beckett, described as the "ultimate endorsement" in the world of Irish theater. From 1989 to 2000, the Tinderbox company hosted an annual Festival of New Irish Playwriting intended to present "artistically dangerous" new plays. The intention behind the Tinderbox was to challenge the sectarian hatreds that led to "the Troubles" of Northern Ireland and create a theater company that would "despite the system" put on new plays that might bring people together. Roddy was one of the co-artistic directors of the company. The Tinderbox company came to be in the 1990s and 2000s one of the leading theater companies in Belfast.

Roddy's performances in Belfast attracted attention of the Royal Shakespeare Company (RSC) and he played roles in the RSC's productions of Billy Roche’s Amphibians and James Robson’s King Baby. In 1998, he played with the RSC for a full season at the company's home in Stratford-upon-Avon. Roddy starred in two plays with the Abbey Theatre in Dublin, namely Observe the Sons of Ulster Marching Towards the Somme and In a Little World of Our Own. For the latter play, he won ESB/Irish Times Award for best supporting actor.  Observe the Sons of Ulster Marching Towards the Somme with its sympathetic portrayal of Protestant Ulstermen serving in the British Army in World War I, the leader of whom is a repressed homosexual, was described as a "landmark" play in Dublin, and Roddy's performance in the play did much to enhance his reputation. In a Little World of Our Own whose subject were Ulster Unionists involved in a paramilitary group  was described an important production. Roddy noted that Gary Mitchell, the playwright who wrote In a Little World of Our Own was Protestant while Frank McGuinness, the playwright who wrote Observe the Sons of Ulster Marching Towards the Somme was a Catholic, saying "Gary and Stuart are coming from different perspectives of course but very similar voices in a way. Neither of them are afraid to be critical of their ‘sides'". In 2004, he was nominated in the ESB/Irish Times Theatre Awards for best actor for his performance in The Weir.

In 2004 and again in 2014, he acted in the controversial play Defender of the Faith by Stuart Carolan, set in 1986 on an isolated farm in County Armagh, where a family that supports the Provisional Irish Republican Army suspects that one of them might be an informer for the Crown. Roddy recalled about the premiere of Defender of the Faith: "At that time the shit was hitting the fan with how many high-ranking IRA people were actually informers. It was a really contentious issue at the time and it left everyone in Northern Ireland very uncertain. It was a paranoid time, that period raised a lot of unanswered questions and the play taps into that. It was also the discovery of a new writer and there was a lot of hype and excitement about it. It’s a terrible pity Stuart’s been taken up in TV recently, there is a mighty play in operation there, it’s quite brilliant...Barney [Roddy's farmhand character] is a scapegoat. He is set up before the play begins as the fall-guy for the higher echelons and the authority figures within the organisation. It is still a very sensitive subject. People like Jean McConville were very like Barney, scapegoats to cover up the higher-up figures in the IRA and that’s still extremely controversial to this day. What Barney represents, there is nothing innocent about him, he’s child-like but he’s guilty in the sense that he’s involved. I see Barney as the missing mother. He is the only allowance that Stuart gives to femininity and that notion of caring and men being affectionate. I always thought there was that feminine aspect in the Barney and Thomas relationship within the family dynamic. He represents that missing mother I think."

Television and film work
Through primarily a theater actor working in Northern Ireland and Ireland, Roddy is best known internationally for work in film and television, having appeared over 60 films and television episodes. One of his best known roles on the screen is also one of his briefest, namely as the assassin who tried to kill Bran Stark in The Kingsroad  episode of Game of Thrones.  In 2013, he told the Irish journalist Hilary Fennell: "Being a professional actor means holding onto your own persona despite edging towards someone else’s. It can be a dangerous process at times: holding onto what you are while being someone else. I regard myself as a shy person. I was a very shy youngster, that’s why I was attracted to drama...I’ve told both my kids how much they have taught me. They’ve taught me to be more fully human and they’ve taught me how to love. The bottom line is love. If I could change one thing in our society it would be racism and bigotry. The fact that some people think they are better than others due to the colour of their skin" In 2018, he starred in Séamus, a short film written and directed by the American filmmaker Gursimran Sandhu.

Filmography
Screenplay (1991)
Between the Lines (1993)
Screen Two (1994)
Circles of Deceit (1996)
The Ruth Rendell Mysteries (1997)
Love and Rage (1998)
Best (2000)
The Escapist (2002)
Pulling Moves (2003)
Boy Eats Girl (2005)
Murphy's Law (2006)
Middletown (2006)
Hunger (2008)
Summer of the Flying Saucer (2008)
Ditching (2009)
Cherrybomb (2009)
Five Minutes of Heaven (2009)
10 Minute Tales (2009)
Jack Taylor (2010)
Mount Analogue (2010)
Game of Thrones (2011)
Grabbers (2012) 
Jump (2012)
Cowboys and Dissidents (2012)
The Good Man (2012)
Dani's Castle (2013)
Ripper Street (2013)
The Light of My Eyes (2014)
Robot Overlords (2014)
I Am Belfast (2015)-narrator.
Today (2015)
Rebellion (2016)
Michael Inside (2017) 
Float Like a Butterfly (2018) 
Don't Go (2018)
The Devil's Doorway (2018)
Séamus (2018)

Books

References

Living people
1954 births
Male actors from Belfast
Male film actors from Northern Ireland
20th-century male actors from Northern Ireland
21st-century male actors from Northern Ireland
Alumni of Ulster University